was a Japanese diplomat who served as ambassador to the United States.

Diplomatic career
Debuchi served as a diplomat in China, where he was head of the Japanese Foreign Office division which dealt with Chinese affairs. He later served as vice minister of foreign affairs for Japan.

In 1928, Debuchi was appointed ambassador to the United States, succeeding Tsuneo Matsudaira. He was due to leave his position during 1931, but remained in the position following the Mukden Incident. As an ambassador, he was well liked in the United States.

In November 1933, Debuchi left his position as ambassador to the United States, apparently due to his failure to convince them not to oppose Japanese actions in Manchukuo (Manchuria). However, he remained part of the Japanese diplomatic mission afterwards, visiting Australia in 1935 as a goodwill ambassador.

Personal life

He and his wife Hama Kikuchi had a son Masaru Debuchi and a daughter Takako Debuchi. His son studied at Princeton University. His daughter married Kōichirō Asakai, who served as ambassador to the United States.

He died on August 19, 1947 from intestinal cancer. He was a Catholic.

References

1878 births
1947 deaths
Ambassadors of Japan to the United States
Japanese expatriates in China